Spirophorina is a suborder of sea sponges belonging to the class Demospongiae.

Bibliography

References

 
Taxa named by Patricia Bergquist